Aberconway House, no. 38, South Street, Mayfair, in the City of Westminster, was constructed between 1920 and 1922 for the industrialist Henry McLaren, 2nd Baron Aberconway, in a neo-Georgian style.
Both properties have a southerly aspect over and access into one of Mayfair's Secret Gardens.
The official architects were Edmund Wimperis and his partner W. B. Simpson. However, 38 South Street was in fact almost entirely designed by the young John Murray Easton who was later responsible for the Royal Horticultural Society's New Hall of 1926–1928.

In 2007, the developer and estate agent Portman Heritage listed the house for sale at £46 million.

References

Houses completed in 1922
Grade II listed houses in the City of Westminster
Buildings and structures in Mayfair